Ingrid Schjelderup (born 21 December 1987) is a Norwegian footballer who plays as a midfielder for Vålerenga of the Norwegian Toppserien. She has previously played for Norwegian Toppserien clubs Kolbotn, Vålerenga and Stabæk as well as Sweden's Linköpings FC and Italy's Fiorentina. She made her debut for the Norway women's national football team in March 2009 and was part of her country's squad at the 2015 FIFA Women's World Cup.

Club career
In November 2009, Schjelderup and Nora Holstad Berge both left Kolbotn to join Swedish Damallsvenskan champions Linköpings FC.

Schjelderup returned to Sweden in December 2015, joining Eskilstuna United DFF from Stabæk on a one-year contract. She declared that she was looking forward to representing one of the Damallsvenskan's best teams. In January 2018 Schjelderup went back to Norway and Vålerenga.

International career
Schjelderup made her senior Norway women's national football team debut in March 2009, in a 2–0 Algarve Cup win over Denmark. After that tournament, Schjelderup was not called up again until 2014. She was selected in Even Pellerud's squad for the 2015 FIFA Women's World Cup.

References

External links
 
 Norwegian national team profile 
 Stabæk club profile 
 Swedish FA profile 
 

1987 births
Living people
Sportspeople from Fredrikstad
Norwegian women's footballers
Norway women's international footballers
Toppserien players
Kolbotn Fotball players
Vålerenga Fotball Damer players
Stabæk Fotball Kvinner players
Norwegian expatriate sportspeople in Sweden
Norwegian expatriate women's footballers
Expatriate women's footballers in Sweden
Linköpings FC players
Eskilstuna United DFF players
Damallsvenskan players
2015 FIFA Women's World Cup players
Women's association football midfielders
Holmlia SK players
UEFA Women's Euro 2017 players